Mark Nicholas Higgins (born 29 September 1958) is an English former footballer who played at centre back for Everton, Manchester United, Bury and Stoke City.

Career
Born in Buxton, Derbyshire, Higgins is the son of former Bolton Wanderers's centre-back John Higgins. Higgins represented England schoolboys prior to signing for Everton.

Higgins joined Everton as an apprentice and earned his first team debut for the Toffees on 5 October 1976. He made a total of 183 appearances for the club, scoring 6 goals. Higgins later picked up a severe injury, which forced him to temporarily retire from the game in May 1984.

Defying all expectations, Higgins returned to the game 18 months later, when he joined Manchester United for £60,000 in December 1985. He made his Manchester United debut in a 2–0 home win over Rochdale in the FA Cup Third Round on 9 January 1986. However, he was unable to recover the form he had shown while with Everton and, after just eight appearances for United (six league, two cup), he was allowed to go on loan to Bury in January 1987 before the transfer was made permanent in February 1987 for a fee of £10,000.

At Gigg Lane Higgins played 82 times for the club in three seasons before joining Stoke City in September 1988. He played 37 times for Stoke in 1988–89 scoring once against Chelsea. In 1989–90 he played nine times for Stoke before being released at the end of the season. He then joined Burnley on trial but injured his back and decided to retire from playing.

Career statistics
Source:

A.  The "Other" column constitutes appearances and goals in the Football League Trophy, Full Members Cup and UEFA Cup.

References

External links
 Profile at StretfordEnd.co.uk
 Profile at MUFCInfo.com

1958 births
Living people
People from Buxton
Footballers from Derbyshire
English footballers
Association football defenders
Everton F.C. players
Manchester United F.C. players
Bury F.C. players
Stoke City F.C. players
English Football League players